William Bruce Rae (23 January 1900 – 26 July 1960) was an Australian rules footballer who played with St Kilda in the Victorian Football League (VFL).

Notes

External links 

1900 births
1960 deaths
Australian rules footballers from Victoria (Australia)
St Kilda Football Club players